Kavalan (also known as Kvalan, Kebalan or Kbalan) was formerly spoken in the Northeast coast area of Taiwan by the Kavalan people (噶瑪蘭). It is an East Formosan language of the Austronesian family.

Kavalan is no longer spoken in its original area. As of 1930, it was used only as a home language. As of 1987, it was still spoken in Atayal territories. In 2000, this language was still reported to be spoken by 24 speakers but considered moribund.

In 2017, a study using the EDGE metric from species conservation found that Kavalan, although critically endangered, was among the most lexically distinct of Austronesian languages.

Dialects
Kavalan consists of the following speech communities ordered from north to south:

Kariawan (Jialiwan 加禮宛) – near Hualien, a formerly Sakizaya-speaking area
Patʀungan (Xinshe 新社) – located in Fungpin (豐濱鄉), Hualien
Kulis (Lide 立德)
Kralut (Zhangyuan 樟原)

These speech communities in eastern Taiwan were named after older settlements from the north, such as Kariawan, Sahut, and Tamayan, where the Kavalan people originally migrated from. Modern-day Kavalan speakers are surrounded by the Amis.

Tsuchida (1985) notes that word lists collected from Lamkham 南崁 (Nankan) and Poting 埔頂 (Buding) are closest to Kavalan, while Li (2001) counts them as 'Basaic' languages.

Many Kavalan can also speak Amis, Taiwanese, Mandarin, and Japanese.

Phonology
There are 15 consonants and 4 vowels in Kavalan.

In Kavalan, Proto-Austronesian phonemes have merged as follows:

 *n, *N, *j, *ɲ as n
 *t, *T, *c as t
 *d, *D, *Z as z
 *s, *S as s
 *q, *ʔ, *H are deleted

The following Proto-Austronesian phonemes are split:
 *k into q and k
 *l into r and ʁ (written as R)
 *a into i (if adjacent to q) and a

The Kavalan language is also notable for having a large inventory of consonant clusters. It is also one of the only two Formosan languages that has geminate consonants, with the other one being Basay. Consonant gemination is also common in the northern Philippine languages, but is non-existent in the Central Philippine languages except for Rinconada Bikol.

Grammar

Morphology
Kavalan nouns and verbs are distinguished by the lack of /a/ in the first syllable (nouns) or presence of /a/ (verbs). Kavalan syllables take on the structure . Kavalan is also one of two Formosan languages to have geminating consonants.

Kavalan affixes include:
 m- (agent focus)
 -um-/-m- (agent focus)
 -in/-n- as variants of ni- (patient)
 -a (irrealis patient-focus marker)
 -an (locative-focus marker, nominalizer)
 -i (imperative, patient focus)
 pa- (causative)
 qa- (future)

Unlike many other Formosan languages, there is no *-en suffix.

Syntax
Kavalan, like most other Formosan and Philippine languages, has many case markers.

 Nominative: a/ya
 Oblique: ta, tu
 Genitive: na, ni
 Locative: sa, ta- -an

Types of focus in Kavalan include:

Agent
Patient
Locative
Instrumental
Beneficiary

Pronouns

Affixes

Prefixes
i-: stative, having to do with location
kar-: rapid motion; defective, not perfect
ki-, qi-: pluck, pick
kin-: number of humans
lu-: flat
luq(e)-: bumpy, rough (used with stative verbs)
m-, -m-, mu-, -u-, -um-: agent-focus
ma-, m-: stative
maq-: where from
mar-: sine kind of shape
mi-: discharge something from the body
mri-: settle down; to shrink, huddle up
mrim-: a division of (a numeral)
nan-: two people (kinship); distributive numeral
ni-, n-, -in-, -n-: past, perfective
pa-: causative (used with active verbs)
pa- -an: agentive
pa-ti: personal marker for the dead
paq-, paqa-: causative (used with stative verbs)
paq-: get on (a boat)
pa-qi-: cause to become
pat-: make a change
pi-: put into, put away; do something to protect a body part; every (time)
qa-: immediate future; ride, take (means of transportation)
qa- -an: place of/for
qaRu-: become, transform into; transformable into
qi-: pick, gather, get
qna-: nominaizer (used with stative verbs; -an is used with active verbs)
Ra-: to transform into
Ra-CV-: light color of
Ri-: catch, get
Ru-: just now; for the first time
sa-: have the event (natural phenomena); do, make, produce, have; secrete (body fluid); tool
sam-CV-: pretend
saqa-: ordinal (numeral)
si-: wear, own, possess
sia-: go towards (place/direction); go to the side (often euphemistic for urinating/defecating)
sim-: reciprocal
siqa-: (number of) times
smu-: finger
sna-: model of, copy of
su-: remove; move downwards, upside down, slanting
su-CV-: stink or smell of
tan-: speak the language
taRi-: position, people in such a position
ti-: instrumental-focus; to take each other (?)
ti- (-an): beneficiary-focus
tRi-CV(C)- (-an): discharge (body discharge) with control
u-: agent-focus; non-human numeral

Suffixes
 -a: irrealis patient-focus marker
 -an: locative-focus marker, nominalizer
 -i: irrealis non-agent-focus imperative

Infixes
-m-, -um-: agent-focus
-n-, -in-, ni-: perfective

References

Notes

General references

External links

 Taiwan government publications: Kavalan dictionary 
 The Academy in Taipei press release: Kavalan dictionary published 
 Yuánzhùmínzú yǔyán xiànshàng cídiǎn 原住民族語言線上詞典  – Kavalan search page at the "Aboriginal language online dictionary" website of the Foundation for the Research and Development of Indigenous Languages
 Kavalan teaching and leaning materials published by the Council of Indigenous Peoples of Taiwan 
 Kavalan translation of President Tsai Ing-wen's 2016 apology to indigenous people – published on the website of the presidential office 

Endangered Austronesian languages
Formosan languages